John Alexander Austin (September 30, 1912 – December 1, 1984) was a pioneering Canadian aviator.

References
 Oswald, Mary, They Led the Way, Wetaskiwin: Canada's Aviation Hall of Fame, 1999.

External links
Hall of Fame site

1912 births
1984 deaths
Canadian aviators
People from Renfrew County